Warmley was a small railway station just south of Mangotsfield on the Midland Railway Mangotsfield and Bath Branch Line. The station was sited just north of a level crossing on the A420 road through the village. It had wooden buildings: the shelter on the down platform (towards Bath) survives and is used on occasion as a refreshment stop on the Bristol & Bath Railway Path, which follows the route of the railway.

Services
The station was served by stopping trains from Bath to Mangotsfield, Bristol St Philips and Bristol Temple Meads, via Bitton and Oldland Common.

References

Former Midland Railway stations
Disused railway stations in Bristol, Bath and South Gloucestershire
Railway stations in Great Britain opened in 1869
Railway stations in Great Britain closed in 1966
Beeching closures in England
1869 establishments in England